The 21st Emmy Awards—also known since 1974 as the 21st Primetime Emmy Awards—were handed out on June 8, 1969.  The ceremony was co-hosted by Bill Cosby and Merv Griffin.

The top shows of the night were Get Smart, which won Outstanding Comedy Series for the second consecutive year, and Outstanding Dramatic Series winner NET Playhouse. NET Playhouse, from the PBS predecessor National Educational Television Network, became the first show outside the Big Three television networks to win a top series award.

Due to several categories being combined for the ceremony, no show received more than two major wins. The most drastic rule change was that all shows that had aired more than two seasons were ineligible. The cause of this change was due to the rise in repeat winners in recent years. There was no winner in the category of Outstanding Single Performance by an Actor in a Supporting Role, because the judges felt that none of the nominees were worthy of an award.

Winners and nominees
Winners are listed in bold and series' networks are in parentheses.

Programs

Acting

Lead performances

Supporting performances

Single performances

Directing

Writing

Most major nominations

By network 
 NBC – 36
 CBS – 22
 ABC – 14

 By program
 Hallmark Hall of Fame (NBC) – 8
 Mission: Impossible (CBS) – 6
 CBS Playhouse (CBS) – 5
 Julia (NBC) – 4

Most major awards

By network 
 NBC – 10
 CBS – 5
 ABC – 4

 By program
 CBS Playhouse (CBS) / Get Smart (NBC) / Male of the Species (NBC) – 2

Notes

References

External links
 Emmys.com list of 1969 Nominees & Winners
 

021
Primetime Emmy Awards
Primetime Emmy Awards
Primetime Emmy
Primetime Emmy Awards